Sam Ntulume, (born c. 1971), is a Ugandan accountant, businessman and incumbent executive director at I&M Bank Uganda, who concurrently serves as the chief operating officer at that commercial bank. He has been at I&M Bank Uganda, since November 2021.

Background and education
Ntulume was born in Uganda . After attending local primary and secondary schools, he was admitted to National College of Business Studies (today Makerere University Business School). He graduated from there with a Diploma in Business Studies.

He holds a Master of Business Administration degree, awarded by the Eastern and Southern African Management Institute, in Arusha, Tanzania. He is also a Fellow of the Association of Chartered Certified Accountants of the United Kingdom and is a member of the Institute of Certified Public Accountants of Uganda.

Career
At the time he joined I&M Bank Uganda, Ntulume's career stretched back nearly three decades, half of which has been in the financial services sector in Uganda and the region. His most recent position was as the Executive Director, Finance & Strategy at NCBA Bank Uganda Limited, another commercial bank.

Previously, he was an executive director, then managing director at NC Bank Uganda Limited, before its merger with Commercial Bank of Africa Uganda Limited, in 2020, to form NCBA Bank Uganda.

Ntulume has also served in senior management positions at Stanbic Bank in both Uganda and Kenya. He was also previously employed by Total M&S Uganda and by the Uganda Revenue Authority.

Other considerations
Since 2010, Sam Ntulume sits on the board of trustees of Sanyu Babies Home, an orphanage in Kampala, Uganda's capital city. He serves as the board treasurer.

See also
 Mark Muyobo

References

External links
 Website of I&M Bank Uganda
 Personal Profile At LinkedIn

Living people
1970s births
Ganda people
Ugandan accountants
Ugandan businesspeople
Makerere University Business School alumni
Eastern and Southern African Management Institute alumni
Ugandan business executives
Ugandan chief executives
Fellows of the Association of Chartered Certified Accountants
People from Central Region, Uganda